Clay Greenbush (born 1968) is an American actor.

He started his career at the age of ten months, with an uncredited appearance in Five Easy Pieces, a movie which starred his father, Billy Greenbush. He played a baby in the arms of Jack Nicholson. He also occasionally guest-starred on Little House on the Prairie, which featured his sisters, twins Lindsay and Sidney Greenbush.

He also had roles in Critters, Elvis and Me, Doogie Howser, M.D., and 2000 Malibu Road.

Greenbush began a full-time acting career in 1994.

Filmography

References

External links

1968 births
American male child actors
American male film actors
Living people
People from Hollywood, Los Angeles